Ritual Spirit is an EP by British trip hop trio Massive Attack, released on 28 January 2016. It features trip hop artist Tricky for the first time since the release of Protection in 1994, and also features Scottish hip-hop group Young Fathers, London rapper Roots Manuva and singer Azekel.

Background
A week before the release of the EP, the group released an iPhone application called "The Fantom", which remixed songs using heartbeat, location and time of day. The app contained snippets of the songs featured on the EP, and promised full functionality "soon".

Critical reception

Ritual Spirit received widespread critical acclaim from contemporary music critics. At Metacritic, which assigns a normalized rating out of 100 to reviews from mainstream critics, the album received an average score of 81, based on 4 reviews, which indicates "universal acclaim".

John Garratt of PopMatters praised the EP, stating, "Pretty much everything that helped the band make a name for itself is on display for these four songs—the simmering tension of title track, the sample-happy soundtrack for urban decay on the opener 'Dead Editors', the hot and steady boil of 'Voodoo in My Blood', and the morose single 'Take It There' featuring the return of Tricky." Katherine St. Asaph of Pitchfork Media gave the EP a favorable review, stating, "Massive Attack were always equally as good producers as they were curators; it's promising that, as much of their old sound as they've retained, they've kept this as well."

Track listing

Notes
"Dead Editors" contains a sample from "Watermelon Man" (1962) by Herbie Hancock.

Personnel
Massive Attack
Robert "3D" Del Naja – vocals, keyboards, guitar, programming, arranging, mixing, producer
Adrian "Tricky" Thaws – keyboards, bass, vocals, programming, mixing, arranging, producer
Grant "Daddy G" Marshall – keyboards, guitar, programming, arranging, mixing, producer

Additional musicians
Euan Dickinson – sound engineer, programming, keyboard, guitar, arranging, mixing, producer
Neil Davidge – keyboard, piano, drums, guitar, bass guitar, backing vocals, programming, mixing
Young Fathers
Kayus Bankole
'G' Hastings
Alloysious Massaquoi
Roots Manuva – vocals (1)
Azekel – vocals (2)
Jeff Wootton – Guitar

Charts

References

Massive Attack EPs
2016 EPs
Virgin Records EPs